was a Japanese businessman and inventor who founded Pioneer Corporation. He was born in Kobe, Japan in 1905, the son of a Christian missionary. In 1936, he founded the Fukuin Shokai Denki Seisakusho company in Osaka, whose name roughly translates to "Blessed Sound Electric Company" or "Gospel Electric Company", owing to Matsumoto's Christian faith and belief that his electronic products could help in missionary works. In 1937 he created the A-8 speaker, which he christened 'Pioneer'. Matsumoto relocated to Tokyo in 1938 and started a small factory that repaired radios and speakers. After World War II, the company expanded rapidly.

His son, Seiya Matsumoto, graduated from Chuo University and joined his father's company as head of sales and marketing until he became president of the company in 1982. The brother of Seiya, Kanya Matsumoto was very technical, just as his father. When he joined the company, he was responsible for technical and productive aspects in the company. In 1961 the name 'Pioneer' was changed to 'Pioneer Electronic Corporation', and it was listed on the Tokyo Stock Exchange. Nozomu Matsumoto died in 1988 at the age of 83.

External links
 http://www.silverpioneer.netfirms.com/components.htm
 http://www.answers.com/topic/pioneer-electronic-corporation?cat=biz-fin

1905 births
1988 deaths
20th-century Japanese businesspeople
Japanese Christians
Pioneer Corporation